The 1968 CONCACAF Champions' Cup was the 4th edition of the annual international club football competition held in the CONCACAF region (North America, Central America and the Caribbean), the CONCACAF Champions' Cup. It determined that year's football club champion in the CONCACAF region.

The tournament was played by 10 teams of 10 nations: Netherlands Antilles, Bermuda, El Salvador, United States, Guatemala, Mexico, Honduras, Suriname, Nicaragua, Costa Rica.

It was played from 26 May till 1 December 1968 under the home/away match system. The tournament was split in 3 zones (North American, Central American and Caribbean), each one qualifying the winner to the final tournament, where the winners of the Central and Caribbean zones played a semi-final to decide who was going to play against the Northern champion in the final. The final was scratched and Toluca were declared champions after both semi-finalists, Aurora and Transvaal, were ejected from the competition (Aurora due to crowd violence and Transvaal for using ineligible players).

Club Deportivo Toluca (actually known as Deportivo Toluca FC) from Mexico thus became for the first time in its history CONCACAF champion.

Caribbean zone

 Transvaal won 4–2 on aggregate score.

Northern zone

First round

 NY Greek Americans won 4–3 on aggregate score.

Second round

 Toluca won 7–3 on aggregate score.

Central American Zone

First round

 Aurora won 2–1 on aggregate score.

 Olimpia won 3–1 on aggregate score.

Second round

 Aurora won 5–1 on aggregate score.

Semi-final

The semi-final was declared null and void, and both teams were ejected from the competition: Aurora after their fans invaded the pitch following the end of the 2nd leg and caused a mass brawl between celebrating Transvaal fans, and Transvaal for using three ineligible players in both legs.

Final
After Aurora and Transvaal were both ejected from the competition, the final was scratched and Toluca were declared champions.

Champion

References

1
CONCACAF Champions' Cup